Mohamed Nasrullah (born 21 February 1982) is an Indonesian diver. He competed in the men's 10 metre platform event at the 2000 Summer Olympics.

References

External links
 

1982 births
Living people
Indonesian male divers
Olympic divers of Indonesia
Divers at the 2000 Summer Olympics
Place of birth missing (living people)
Divers at the 2010 Asian Games
Asian Games competitors for Indonesia
Southeast Asian Games medalists in diving
Southeast Asian Games gold medalists for Indonesia
Southeast Asian Games silver medalists for Indonesia
Southeast Asian Games bronze medalists for Indonesia
21st-century Indonesian people